Pavlodar International Airport, also colloquially known as Pavlodar South , is an airport in Kazakhstan located  southeast of Pavlodar. It services medium-sized airliners.

History
Until 1999, The airport was part of Irtysh Avia airline. Since 2000, it was under control of Pavlodar oblast akimat, and in 2006, it was transferred to Samruk-Kazyna holding.

The airport was renovated and was awarded an ICAO category I certificate in 2006.

Airlines and destinations

See also
Transport in Kazakhstan
List of the busiest airports in the former USSR

References

Airports built in the Soviet Union
Airports in Kazakhstan